The 2021 Davidson Wildcats baseball team represented Davidson College during the 2021 NCAA Division I baseball season. It was the program's 120th baseball season, and their 6th season the Atlantic 10 Conference. The regular season began on February 20 and concluded on May 22, 2021.

Davidson finished the season with a 27–24 record.

Preseason

A10 coaches' poll
The Atlantic 10 baseball coaches' poll was released on February 18, 2021. Davidson was picked finish fourth.

Roster

Game log 

Schedule Source:
*Rankings are based on the team's current ranking in the D1Baseball poll.

Rankings

Honors

References

External links 
 Davidson College Baseball

Davidson
Davidson Wildcats baseball seasons
Davidson Wildcats baseball